The 1942 Tour de Suisse was the ninth edition of the Tour de Suisse cycle race and was held from 29 July to 2 August 1942. The race started and finished in Zürich. The race was won by Ferdinand Kübler.

General classification

References

1942
Tour de Suisse